Kanō Takanobu (1 December 1571 – 18 October 1618) was a Japanese painter of the Kanō school of painting during the Azuchi–Momoyama period (1573–).  He was the father of Kanō Tan'yū, one of the most prominent painters of the school.

Life and career

Takanobu was born in Kyoto on the 25th day of the 11th month of the 2nd year of Genki.  He was the youngest son of the Kanō school head painter Kanō Eitoku (1543–90) and younger brother of Kanō Mitsunobu.

When Kanō Naganobu (1577–1654)—Eitoku's brother—moved at the behest of the recently ascendent Tokugawa shogunate to its new administrative capital of Edo (modern Tokyo) around 1610–15, Takanobu remained in Kyoto, where the commissions he received indicate he was a favourite of the court.  At the time only Takanobu and Naganobu had sufficient skill to head branches of the school.

With financial backing from the Tokugawa shogunate, Takanobu conceived and oversaw the painting to be done for the new palace of Emperor Go-Mizunoo, work which was finished in 1614 with Takanobu applying the final touches to many of the sliding panels there and in surrounding buildings.  The twenty panels depicting thirty-two Chinese sages in the throne room of the shishin-den are attributed to Takanobu.  These panels are some of the few works of Takanobu to have survived, and are the oldest surviving paintings from the shishin-den.

Another son, Kanō Naonobu (1607–50), succeeded as head of the Kyoto branch upon Takanobu's death in 1618, though he too moved to Edo in 1630. The line continued under Mitsunobu's son Sadanobu, who died without an heir in 1623 but had adopted Takanobu's youngest son Yasunobu, who thus continued the Kyoto line until he also was made goyō eshi and moved to Edo, though he maintained his claim as head of the Kyoto branch.

References

Works cited

External links

1571 births
1618 deaths
16th-century Japanese people
17th-century Japanese people
16th-century Japanese artists
17th-century Japanese artists
16th-century Japanese painters
17th-century Japanese painters
Kanō school